Vall-llobrega is a village and municipality in the province of Girona and autonomous community of Catalonia, Spain.

Dating from the 3rd or 2nd millennium BC, this has 3 slabs in their original state and the remains of a tomb that these once covered.

References

External links
 Government data pages 

Municipalities in Baix Empordà
Populated places in Baix Empordà